Zebec may refer to:

Alternate spelling of xebec, a Mediterranean sailing ship

People with the surname
Branko Zebec (1929–1988), Croatian footballer and manager
 (born 1982), Croatian soccer referee from Cestica, see List of FIFA international referees

See also

Xebec (studio), a Japanese animation studio
Zebecke, Zala County, Hungary
Sebec (disambiguation)
Sebek (disambiguation)